Jan Herman "Caius" Welcker (9 July 1885 – 13 February 1939) was a Dutch football (soccer) player who competed in the 1908 Summer Olympics. He was born in Alkmaar and died in Schiedam.

Welcker, who formed the famous right wing of his club side Quick and the national team with Edu Snethlage, won 15 caps, scoring five times. He was a member of the Dutch team, which won the bronze medal in the football tournament.

References

External links
profile

1885 births
1939 deaths
Dutch footballers
Netherlands international footballers
Footballers at the 1908 Summer Olympics
Olympic footballers of the Netherlands
Olympic bronze medalists for the Netherlands
Sportspeople from Alkmaar
Olympic medalists in football
Medalists at the 1908 Summer Olympics
Association football forwards
Footballers from North Holland